The Asian Pastry Cup (APC) is an international pastry competition taking place every two years in Singapore. It is the official selective platform for the Asian teams who will go and compete at the World Pastry Cup in Lyon, France.

Competition  
Founded in 2006 in partnership with UBM Singapore, Valrhona, and the support of Singapore Pastry Alliance, the Asian Pastry Cup has reached high awareness and has set itself as a large Asian Live Pastry competition for pastry professionals. This live competition pits national teams of pastry chefs against one another, culminating in a display of delightful chocolate show piece, sugar show piece and pastry creations (plated desserts as well as chocolate cake).

It is held in Singapore every two years in conjunction with FHA “Food & Hotel Asia”, a renowned trade show within the food and hospitality industry in Asia, gathering about 4,000 international exhibitors and 78,000 trade attendees coming from 100 countries.

The Asian Pastry Cup goals are:
 Igniting creativity and interest in this culinary art
 Raising the Pastry Industry status in the region
 Providing a communication and education platform among pastry enthusiasts in Asia
 Promoting the best Asian Pastry Chefs of the year from all over Asia

Each team is composed of two competitors and one coach. The coach will form the jury and will taste the creations of other teams.

The competitors will have eight hours to prepare :
 Three chocolate cakes made out of Valrhona chocolates for eight persons
 18 plated desserts of same composition made with Ravifruit products
 One sugar showpiece
 One chocolate showpiece

Results

Medal count

References

External links
 YouTube videos
 Asianpastrycup.com

Cooking competitions
Competitions in Singapore